A spoken game is a game which uses words instead of cards, boards, game pieces, or other paraphernalia.

Spoken games can often also be categorized as guessing games, word games, or because of their freedom from equipment or visual engagement, car games.

Well-known spoken games include Twenty Questions, Riddle Me Ree, and Password. Because of their nature, spoken games are usually non-commercial.

Game terminology